Altitude is the fourth studio album by the Dutch gothic metal band Autumn, released in Europe 13 February 2009 and  on 23 February 2009 in North America.

Track listing

Charts

External links

References 

2009 albums
Autumn (band) albums